C. R. Iyyunni (15 October 1890 - 21 January 1961) was an Indian National Congress politician from Thrissur, Kerala. He was a member of Parliament for Travancore-Cochin from 1952 to 1957.

Early life and education 
Shri Iyyunni Chalakka was born on 15 October 1890. His father was Shri Rappayi. He was educated at C.M.S. High School, Trichur, Maharaja's College, Ernakulam, Madras Christian College, Madras and Law College, Trivandrum.

Political career 
He served as an advocate in Thrissur along with  Congress activities in the locality. He was also renowned for his role in the promotion of banking institutions such as Catholic Syrian Bank Limited, Malabar Bank, Cochin Reserve Bank, Indian Insurance and Banking Corporation. He held other offices such as Chairman of Trichur Municipality, President of Trichur Bar Association, President of Civil Liberties Union, Chairman of Managing Committee, Indo-Mercantile Bank, Minister of Revenue in Cochin State, Member of K.P.C.C., Member of Cochin D.C.C. and Parliamentary Board and Public Relations committee Travancore-Cochin State.

Death 
Iyyunni died on 21 January 1961.

References

1890 births
India MPs 1952–1957
Indian National Congress politicians from Kerala
Lok Sabha members from Kerala
Politicians from Thrissur
1961 deaths